| tries = {{#expr:
+  4 +  1 +  5 + 2 +  5 +  2
+  1 +  5 +  6 + 1 +  7 +  2
+  4 +  5 +  6 + 6 +  3 +  3
+  3 +  8 +  6 + 0 +  1 +  2
+  0 +  2 +  6 + 8 +  6 +  3
+  5 +  6 +  6 + 2 +  9 +  4
+  6 +  7 +  4 + 3 +  3 + 10
+  1 +  4 +  2 + 4 +  0 +  6
+  4 +  5 +  6 + 4 +  5
+  4 +  7 +  5 + 2 +  5 +  4
+  1 +  5 +  1 + 1 +  2 +  4
+  3 +  5 +  3 + 6 +  3 + 10
+  2 +  1 +  7 + 5 +  3 +  5
+ 10 +  8 +  4 + 4 + 10 +  8
+  3 +  4 +  2 + 5 +  2 +  7
+  7 +  8 +  5 + 5 +  6 +  3
+  3 +  2 +  3 + 7 +  4 +  3
+  7 +  3 +  0 + 5 +  7 +  6
+  5 + 10 +  9 + 5 +  8 +  3
+  1 + 14 +  3 + 5 +  5 +  1
+  8
+  1 +  6 +  4 + 3 +  7 +  5
+  9 +  5 + 13 + 5 +  8 +  9
+  7 +  6 +  5
}}
| top point scorer = Gareth Steenson (Exeter)(258 points)
| top try scorer = Thomas Waldrom (Exeter)(13 tries)
| website    = www.premiershiprugby.com
| prevseason = 2014–15
| nextseason = 2016–17
}}

The 2015–16 Aviva Premiership was the 29th season of the top flight English domestic rugby union competition and the sixth one to be sponsored by Aviva. The reigning champions entering the season were Saracens, who had claimed their second title after defeating Bath in the 2015 final. Worcester Warriors had been promoted as champions from the 2014–15 RFU Championship at the first attempt.

The competition was broadcast by BT Sport for the third successive season. Highlights of each weekend's games were shown on ITV 4.

Summary
Saracens won their third title after defeating Exeter Chiefs in the final at Twickenham having also topped the regular season table. London Irish were relegated after being unable to win their penultimate game of the season. It was the second time that London Irish have been relegated from the top flight since the leagues began and the first time since the 1993–94 Premiership Rugby season.

The competition began slightly later than normal, due to the 2015 Rugby World Cup taking place in England and in a slight change to usual, the London Double Header at Twickenham, the twelfth instance since its inception in 2004, was played in round 5 instead of round 1.

Rule changes
This season was the first of several significant changes to the Premiership's salary cap regulations:
 The base salary cap, which was £4.76 million in 2014–15, rose to £5.1 million.
 The amount of "academy credits" available to each club—credits against the cap for younger players on the senior squad who were developed at the club—rose from £240,000 to £400,000. The number of "academy credits" remained at eight, as in past seasons, but the credit per player rose from £30,000 to £50,000. A club that could use all of its available credits in both 2014–15 and 2015–16 saw its effective cap rise from £5 million to £5.5 million.
 Each club is now allowed to exclude two players from the salary cap calculations, up from one in 2014–15. However, the two slots for what the Premiership calls "excluded players" differ in how they can be used. The first slot can be used on a player on the club's current roster. The new slot can only be used for a player who had not been in the Premiership during the 12 months preceding the start of his contract. In a change from the rules that prevailed from 2011–12 through to 2014–15, a player's presence on or absence from a Rugby World Cup roster is no longer relevant to his status as an excluded player.

In addition to the above, a standard cap provision applicable only in Rugby World Cup years, gave each club a £35,000 cap credit (up from £30,000 in the last World Cup season of 2011–12) for each member of the senior squad who participated in the tournament.

Teams
Twelve teams compete in the league – the top eleven teams from the previous season and Worcester Warriors who were promoted from the 2014–15 RFU Championship after a top flight absence of one year. They replaced London Welsh who were relegated after one year in the top flight.

Stadiums and locations

Pre-season
The 2015 edition of the Singha Premiership Rugby Sevens  was held in August. Once again, the four Welsh Regions contested a group, alongside the twelve Premiership clubs, which were split into three groups. The top two sides from each group contested the series final at the Twickenham Stoop on 28 August. The series was won by Welsh region Newport Gwent Dragons who beat Premiership side Wasps in the final.

Table

Regular season
Fixtures for the season were announced by Premiership Rugby at 11am on 3 July 2015. Unlike previous seasons, the London Double Header would not take place in round 1 because Twickenham Stadium was being used for the 2015 Rugby World Cup, but would instead take place during round 5, on 28 November 2015.

One game during this season was played on foreign soil, in the United States. The London Irish v Saracens match – played in Round 16 on 12 March 2016 – took place at the Red Bull Arena in Harrison, New Jersey.

Round 1

Round 2

Round 3

Round 4

Round 5

Round 6

Round 7

Round 8

Round 9

Round 10

Round 11

Round 12

Round 13

Round 14

Round 15

Round 16

Round 17

Round 18

Round 19

Round 20

Round 9 rescheduled match

This match – originally scheduled to be held during Round 9, on 8 January 2016 – was postponed due to a European Rugby Champions Cup fixture rearrangement that occurred as a result of the Paris terrorist attacks in November 2015. It was further rescheduled from 13 April 2016, after Sale Sharks were eliminated from the European Rugby Challenge Cup.

Round 21

Round 22

Play-offs
As in previous seasons, the top four teams in the Premiership table, following the conclusion of the regular season, contest the play-off semi-finals in a 1st vs 4th and 2nd vs 3rd format, with the higher ranking team having home advantage. The two winners of the semi-finals then meet in the Premiership Final at Twickenham on 28 May 2016.

Bracket

Semi-finals

Final

Leading scorers
Note: Flags indicate national union as has been defined under WR eligibility rules. Players may hold more than one non-WR nationality.

Most points
Source:

Most tries
Source:

Season attendances

By club

Source:

Highest attendances

Notes

References

External links
 

 
2015-16
 
England